Shamsul Huda Chaudhury (1 May 1920  – 15 February 2000) was a Bangladeshi politician, mass-media administrator, minister and two time Speaker of the Bangladesh Jatiya Sangsad.

Early life
Chaudhury was born on 1 May 1920 in Sufi, Birbhum, West Bengal, British India. In 1941, he graduated with a B.A. from the Presidency College, Kolkata. He also got M.A. and LL.B. Degree from the Aligarh Muslim University. From 1943 to 1944, he was the Vice President of Aligarh University Students Union. He was the President of All Bengal Muslim Students League. He was a successful debater in his student life and awards for his debate performances. In 1943, he was awarded with the Sir Morris Goar Trophy in the All India Debate competition.

Career
Chaudhury was the regional director of All India Radio and after the Partition of India in 1948, he joined the Pakistan Radio. He was also the Deputy Director of tourism department. He was the founder Director of Pakistan International Airlines and the Chief of Public Relations of East Pakistan Industrial Development Corporation.

In 1970, Chaudhury was the Secretary-General, East Pakistan of the Convention Muslim League (CML). He stood as a CML candidate in the 1970 Pakistani general election, and was elected Member of the National Assembly (MNA) for constituency Mymensingh-XI.

He served as the Chairman of Bangladesh Broadcasting Inquiry Commission in 1976. He was appointed Advisor to the Information Ministry in 1977. Chaudhury was elected as the Member of the Parliament in 1979. He served as the Minister of Information, Minister of Youth and Sports , Minister of Cultural Affairs, Minister of Religious Affairs, Minister of Railways, and Minister of Planning. He was elected the Member of the Parliament for the second time in 1986 and became the Speaker of Jatiya Sangsad. He served a second term as Speaker of Jatiya Sangsad for the second time from 1986 to April 1991.

Personal life
He was married with Leila Arjumand Banu (1929-1995), a music artiste and social worker.

Death
Chaudhury died on 15 February 2000 and his buried in Dhaka beside his wife, Leila Arjumand Banu.

References

1920 births
2000 deaths
Speakers of the Jatiya Sangsad
Information ministers of Bangladesh
Cultural Affairs ministers of Bangladesh
Youth and Sports ministers of Bangladesh
Planning ministers of Bangladesh
Railways ministers of Bangladesh
Religious affairs ministries of Bangladesh
2nd Jatiya Sangsad members
3rd Jatiya Sangsad members
4th Jatiya Sangsad members
Road Transport and Bridges ministers of Bangladesh
Bangladeshi people of Indian descent
People from Birbhum district